Stuart is a city in Lincoln Township, Adair County, and in Stuart Township, Guthrie County, in the U.S. state of Iowa. That part of the city within Guthrie County is part of the Des Moines–West Des Moines Metropolitan Statistical Area.  The population was 1,782 at the 2020 census.

History
Stuart got its start in the late 1860s, following construction of the Chicago, Rock Island and Pacific Railroad through the territory. It is named for Charles Stuart, who was instrumental in bringing the railroad to the city.

Geography

Demographics

2010 census
As of the census of 2010, there were 1,648 people, 667 households, and 423 families living in the city. The racial makeup of the city was 97.1% White, 0.4% African American, 0.2% Native American, 0.2% Asian, 0.6% from other races, and 1.6% from two or more races. Hispanic or Latino of any race were 2.5% of the population.

There were 667 households, of which 31.0% had children under the age of 18 living with them, 46.9% were married couples living together, 11.5% had a female householder with no husband present, 4.9% had a male householder with no wife present, and 36.6% were non-families. 31.0% of all households were made up of individuals, and 15.1% had someone living alone who was 65 years of age or older. The average household size was 2.34 and the average family size was 2.91.

The median age in the city was 41.5 years. 24.5% of residents were under the age of 18; 6.6% were between the ages of 18 and 24; 22.9% were from 25 to 44; 25.6% were from 45 to 64; and 20.4% were 65 years of age or older. The gender makeup of the city was 48.4% male and 51.6% female.

2000 census
As of the census of 2000, there were 1,712 people, 695 households, and 460 families living in the city. The racial makeup of the city was 98.36% White, 0.06% African American, 0.06% Native American, 0.18% Asian, 0.53% from other races, and 0.82% from two or more races. Hispanic or Latino of any race were 1.11% of the population.

There were 695 households, out of which 30.8% had children under the age of 18 living with them, 51.9% were married couples living together, 10.5% had a female householder with no husband present, and 33.7% were non-families. 29.6% of all households were made up of individuals, and 17.0% had someone living alone who was 65 years of age or older. The average household size was 2.37 and the average family size was 2.92.

24.3% were under the age of 18, 7.5% from 18 to 24, 25.6% from 25 to 44, 20.9% from 45 to 64, and 21.7% were 65 years of age or older. The median age was 40 years. For every 100 females, there were 93.7 males. For every 100 females age 18 and over, there were 85.4 males.

The median income for a household in the city was $33,491, and the median income for a family was $41,600. Males had a median income of $31,156 versus $21,638 for females. The per capita income for the city was $17,113. About 6.6% of families and 8.4% of the population were below the poverty line, including 9.8% of those under age 18 and 6.1% of those age 65 or over.

Education
Stuart is within the West Central Valley Community School District. The district was established on July 1, 2001 by the merger of the Stuart-Menlo Community School District and the Dexfield Community School District. The former was established on July 1, 1971 by the merger of the Stuart and Menlo school districts.

Notable people  

 Osborn Deignan - received Medal of Honor for actions in the Spanish–American War
 William R. Peers - United States Army Lieutenant General - Best known for presiding over the Peers Commission of the My Lai Massacre and for service with Detachment 101
 Buck Shaw - offensive tackle who blocked for George Gipp on Knute Rockne's first undefeated University of Notre Dame football team, winner of two Sugar Bowls as Head Coach of Santa Clara University, the first football head coach at the United States Air Force Academy, the Philadelphia Eagles head coach who won 1960 NFL Championship, and the only coach to have beaten Vince Lombardi in the playoffs.
 A. H. Wilkinson- Wisconsin state senator; born in Stuart.

See also

Four buildings in town are listed on the National Register of Historic Places:
The former All Saints Catholic Church (1910)
Chicago, Rock Island and Pacific Railroad: Stuart Passenger Station (1869)
Masonic Temple Building (1894)
Sexton Hotel (1907)

References

External links
 
 Official City Website
 City-Data Comprehensive Statistical Data and more about Stuart

 

Cities in Adair County, Iowa
Cities in Guthrie County, Iowa
Cities in Iowa
Des Moines metropolitan area
1860s establishments in Iowa